The ITF Beach Tennis Tour (ITF BTT) is a beach tennis contest organized by the International Tennis Federation. It began in 2008, and has already seen an increase of nearly six times in the number of tournaments on the ITF BTT calendar.

Points
Players are ranked according to total number of points attained. Points are awarded throughout each tournament as follows:

References

External links
 ITF Beach Tennis Tour
 Current player rankings

International Tennis Federation
Exhibition tennis tournaments